Samuel Craig Schulz (born 19 September 1992) is a former professional Australian rules footballer who played for the Greater Western Sydney Giants in the Australian Football League (AFL).

Originally from Culcairn in the Riverina region of New South Wales, he played for the Murray Bushrangers in the TAC Cup prior to being recruited as one of the Giants first NSW zone selections in mid-2010. Schulz made his AFL debut in round 12 of the 2012 AFL season against .

At the conclusion of 2013, Schulz was delisted, however he was later re-drafted by GWS in the 2014 rookie draft.

After failing to play a game since his debut in 2012, he was delisted in October 2015.

References

External links

1992 births
Living people
People from Culcairn
Greater Western Sydney Giants players
Australian rules footballers from New South Wales
Murray Bushrangers players